"J'ai tout oublié" is a 2001 song recorded as a duet by the French artist Marc Lavoine and the Italian singer Cristina Marocco. The song was released on 19 November 2001 as the second single from Lavoine's eighth album, just entitled Marc Lavoine. It reached number one on the French Singles Chart, thus becoming to date the most successful single of the singer in France.

Background and cover versions
The song was written by Marc Lavoine and the music composed by Georges Lunghini, the father of Elsa Lunghini. This song allowed Lavoine to take up with the success, because its previous single failed to reach Top 50. "J'ai tout oublié" was much aired on many radios such as NRJ.

In 2004, the song was covered by Jean-Louis Aubert, Calogero and Lorie on Les Enfoirés' album Les Enfoirés dans l'espace. This 4:57 version is the tenth track.

Chart performances
In France, the single went straight to number eight on 27 November 2001, and gained a few places almost every week, until reaching number-one in the 14th week, and stayed there for two weeks. Then, the single almost did not stop to drop on the chart and totaled 18 weeks in the top ten, 27 weeks in the top 50 and 30 weeks in the top 100. It achieved Gold status and was ranked respectively number 69 and number 20 on 2001 and 2002 End of the Year Charts. As of August 2014, it is the 63rd best-selling single of the 21st century in France, with 359,000 units sold.

On the Ultratop top 40, the single charted for 21 weeks, from 8 December 2001 to 27 April 2002, including eleven weeks in the top ten. After reaching a peak at number four in the 13th week, the single dropped on the chart. It was certified Gold disc and featured at number 50 on 2002 Annual Chart.

Track listings
 CD single
 "J'ai tout oublié" — 4:05
 "Ma Jonque est jaune"	by Marc Lavoine (Jean Fauque/Marc Lavoine) — 3:30

Personnel
 Programmations : Jean-François Berger and Mathew Vaughan
 Keyboards : Jean-François Berger
 Background vocals : Claire Keim
 First violin : Gavyn Wright

Charts and sales

Peak positions

Year-end charts

Certifications

References

External links
 "J'ai tout oublié", lyrics
 "J'ai tout oublié", music video

2001 singles
Cristina Marocco songs
Marc Lavoine songs
Songs written by Marc Lavoine
SNEP Top Singles number-one singles
Male–female vocal duets
2001 songs